This list of Intercity-Express lines in Germany includes all Intercity-Express lines in Germany, not including ICE Sprinter. The latest changes to the Intercity Express network took place at the timetable change on 12 December 2021. The network currently has 35 scheduled lines.

Legend 

 Line
 The official line name given by DB Fernverkehr for each line. Some lines, which have many branches, are divided into individual sections, which deviate slightly from the basic line.

 Route
 The route represents all stops on a route. Stops, which are served only by a few trains during the day, but are passed through or bypassed several times a day, are shown in italics.

 Stock
 This column indicates which type of ICE train usually runs on this line.

Lines (2022/23)

10–15 

The lines start in Berlin. Line 10 starts at Gesundbrunnen station and runs toward Cologne. Lines 12 and 13 operate from Berlin Ostbahnhof via Brunswick to Frankfurt, while lines 11 and 15 run from the low level of Berlin Hauptbahnhof via Erfurt to Frankfurt. Some trains start/end in Berlin-Gesundbrunnen (11 and 15), Hamburg (11), Kiel (11) and Warnemünde (15).

10 

Line 10 runs hourly between Berlin and Düsseldorf or Cologne. At Hamm, the train is divided or combined depending on direction of travel. One portion of the train runs via the Ruhr to Düsseldorf, some continuing to Cologne and Aachen and others to Cologne/Bonn Airport. The other train portion runs via the Bergisches Land to Cologne, some continuing to Bonn and Koblenz.

From Monday to Saturday, ICE 832/841 run from/to Hanover via Bremen to Oldenburg. Nienburg (Weser) is only served towards Oldenburg. During the night from Sunday to Monday, ICE 850 runs from Berlin to Oldenburg.

11 

Line 11 runs from Hamburg via Berlin and Frankfurt to Munich. The services run over the Erfurt–Leipzig/Halle high-speed railway between Leipzig and Erfurt and the Mannheim–Stuttgart high-speed railway between Mannheim and Stuttgart. The section from Berlin to Munich is served every two hours. Some trains start or end in Hamburg-Altona. The trains starting in Berlin start in Berlin-Gesundbrunnen or Berlin Hauptbahnhof.

At 8:45 pm on Sunday evening, ICE 990 leaves Munich Hauptbahnhof and runs via Ulm, Stuttgart, Frankfurt and Hanover to Hamburg Hauptbahnhof, which it reaches around 6:00 in the morning. This ICE does not run from Fulda over the high-speed line to Hanover, but first via Bad Hersfeld and only from Göttingen on the high-speed line. On other days of the week this service ends in Frankfurt.

Furthermore, ICE 991 runs from Mondays to Fridays from Wiesbaden via Mainz, Mannheim and Stuttgart to Munich.

On some days another night ICE is added from Munich to Berlin with the following route:

12 

Services on the line run every two hours from Berlin via Brunswick, Kassel, Frankfurt and Mannheim to Switzerland. From Karlsruhe, it runs on parts of the unfinished Karlsruhe–Basel high-speed railway. Trains run via Basel to Interlaken three times a day.

Line 12 overlaps with line 13 every hour between Berlin and Fulda, and line 43 between Mannheim and Basel.

Monday to Friday, the last northbound train is the ICE 272 from Göttingen to Hamburg-Altona, where it arrives at 2:00 a.m.

13 
This line was introduced at the timetable change in December 2017. It connects Berlin and Frankfurt via Brunswick. It replaced line 11, which now runs via Erfurt instead of Brunswick. The trains run every 2 hours.

The ICE 1598 service runs as a Sprinter between Frankfurt and Berlin Spandau, using the Hanover freight bypass.

In addition, an extra train runs as ICE 1193 (Sunday) and ICE 1195 (Sunday, Friday to Frankfurt Hbf) from Berlin via Hanover to Stuttgart as line 13.

14 

Since 2007, ICE line 14 has been running additional services between Berlin and Essen. The first IC trains from Berlin to Herzogenrath were already operated in 2009 as IC 2222/2223 and extended to Aachen in 2014. Individual trains also went to Stralsund (IC1944) or Cologne (IC1945). The train pair ICE 1545/1548 was operated with ICE vehicles for the first time in December 2020 and runs daily between Berlin and Aachen. Since December 2020, the additional trips to Stralsund and Cologne have been eliminated. By 2026, the ICE 14 trains will run from Aachen to Essen with a train section to Hamburg-Altona (ICE 1555/1558) with stops in Recklinghausen, HH-Harburg, Hamburg Hbf and HH-Dammtor.

15 
Line 15 is an ICE line, parts of which have the character of a Sprinter line. It was introduced in December 2015. Four pairs of trains (six pairs on Fridays and Sundays) connect Berlin daily with Frankfurt in less than 4 hours, around 15 minutes faster than via Braunschweig. The service on the entire section between Berlin and Frankfurt was increased to two-hour intervals with the timetable change in December 2017. Individual trains have continued to Warnemünde since December 2018.

Already in the annual timetable 2003/2004 there was an ICE line 15 as a successor to the Interregio line 15, but with a route via Potsdam, Dessau and Naumburg and Weimar. In the timetables 2004/2005 and 2005/2006 there were three train pairs of the ICE line 15 Frankfurt-Erfurt-Halle-Berlin together with the ICE line 51 Dortmund-Paderborn-Kassel-Erfurt-Leipzig-Dresden as a line exchanger in time with the ICE Line 50 Frankfurt-Erfurt-Leipzig-Dresden.

In the opposite direction individual services start in Darmstadt or even in Stuttgart. From Frankfurt to Berlin trains run as a Sprinter and serve only Erfurt and Halle. On the other sections all the smaller ICE stations are served.

One pair of trains runs from Monday to Friday and Sundays via Frankfurt to Saarbrücken.

Since December 2017, some services have been operated by ICE 3 (instead of ICE T), achieving a travel time reduction of about ten minutes.

18–28 

The primary route segments of lines 18, 20, 22, 24, 25, 26 and 28 all begin in Hamburg-Altona station. Some services continue to Kiel and Lübeck, Oldenburg or Stralsund and Binz. The trains to Lübeck and Kiel do not stop in Hamburg-Altona.

Lines 18 and 28 go via Berlin, while lines 20, 22, 24, 25 and 26 go via Hanover.

Occasionally a train portion begins in Bremen, which is then coupled in Hanover with a portion from Hamburg. Lines 20 and 22 pass through several stations in larger cities without stopping. During some exhibitions, lines 20, 22, 25 and 26 also serve Hannover Messe/Laatzen station.

18 

The line 18 was established with the opening of the Nuremberg–Erfurt high-speed railway. The trains start in Hamburg or occasionally in Berlin, the first train in the morning starts in Berlin Gesundbrunnen. Line 18 runs exclusively via Halle, while the otherwise similar line 28 runs via Leipzig. Line 29 uses the same route between Berlin and Munich but stops at fewer stations. Coburg is served only by two trains to the north. Only three pairs of trains on this line stop in Bamberg daily. Up to three train pairs to/from Nuremberg run via Ingolstadt, one train a day running north on this route passes through Ingolstadt without stopping. The other three pairs of trains each day change direction of travel in Nuremberg and run via Augsburg to Munich Hauptbahnhof, with further stops in Donauwörth and München-Pasing. Services on the line run every two hours, resulting, in conjunction with line 28, in an hourly service between Munich and Berlin.

20 
Line 20 connects Hamburg every two hours with Zurich, Chur or Basel. Between Hamburg and Frankfurt, it overlaps with line 22 to produce an hourly frequency. Some trains start back in Kiel, then run via Neumünster and Hamburg Dammtor to Hamburg Hauptbahnhof. This line passes through some stations like Hamburg-Harburg, Lüneburg, Uelzen, Fulda or Hanau without stopping. 

Every day, the first ICE service of the line runs from Wiesbaden to Hamburg-Altona (ICE 672).

22 

Line 22 connects Hamburg with Stuttgart every two hours. Between Hamburg and Frankfurt (Main) it overlaps with line 20 to produce an hourly frequency. Some trains which start back in Kiel do not serve Hamburg-Altona. Besides Hamburg-Harburg, the stations Fulda and Hanau are not served by this line. One train pair runs from Frankfurt (Main) to Oldenburg.

24 
Line 24 was spun off from line 26 for the 2021 timetable and includes the individual trains that run between Hamburg and Kassel one hour later than the services on line 26, which run every two hours, and serve other destinations. These include a pair of trains to Rostock Monday to Friday, extra services on weekend between Flensburg and Munich, and a daily pair of Intercity trains from Hamburg-Altona, which is operated to Augsburg. Half continue via Kempten to Oberstdorf and the other services via Munich East to Berchtesgaden.

25 

Services on the line run hourly from Hamburg to Munich. Only a few trains stop in the stations of Lüneburg and Uelzen between Hamburg and Hanover. Every two hours, a train portion begins either in Bremen or Oldenburg, which is coupled in Hannover with another train portion coming from somewhere else or starting in Hanover. Delmenhorst, Verden and Nienburg are served by individual services only. The line operates almost exclusively on the Nuremberg–Munich high-speed railway, while only a few trains go through Treuchtlingen, Donauwörth and Augsburg.

In the night from Sunday to Monday the ICE 781 departs at 2:30 from Berlin Ostbahnhof to Munich. However, this does not run on the high-speed line Berlin-Hannover, but via Potsdam and Magdeburg.

The last ICE service on the line each day runs from Hamburg-Altona to Wiesbaden.

26 

Services on the line run every two hours between Hamburg and Karlsruhe and stop at a few stations that are not served by most ICE lines, for example in Lüneburg, Uelzen and Celle. In addition, it does not use the Hanover–Würzburg high-speed railway between Kassel and Frankfurt, but runs between Kassel and Frankfurt via the Main–Weser Railway, which takes longer. A pair of trains run as an Intercity service to Westerland. In addition, there are individual trains that run between Hamburg and Kassel with an hour offset. These became part of line 24 in December 2020.

27 
Line 27 consists of a of train that starts in Berlin Hauptbahnhof, but operations in the opposite direction end in Berlin-Charlottenburg. The train pair  supplements the EC 27 service and connects Berlin with the Czech Republic and Austria using a České dráhy Railjet set.

28 

Services on line 28 begin in the north of Germany, either in Hamburg, Stralsund or seasonally in Binz. The line runs via Leipzig, while the otherwise similar line 18 runs via Halle. Only a few stops are served between Hamburg and Berlin. After crossing Berlin, trains run via Leipzig and Erfurt. In Coburg, there are three trains to the south and two trains to the north, since a stop in Coburg would cause a travel delay of about 12 minutes, making it impossible to achieve a two-hour connection with lines 18 or 28. Between Nuremberg and Munich all trains run via Ingolstadt, but only one service (running south) stops. The service runs every two hours, together with line 18 there is an hourly service between Hamburg and Nuremberg and for part of the day continuing to Munich.

29 

Line 29 was re-launched in December 2017. It connects Berlin and Munich. Until 2018, three pairs of trains daily connected Berlin with Munich in under 4 hours. The line runs between Halle and Erfurt via the new Erfurt–Leipzig/Halle high-speed railway and between Erfurt and Nuremberg via the Nuremberg–Erfurt high-speed railway. With the timetable change in December 2018, services were increased to 5 Sprinter train pairs, resulting in an approximately two-hourly service. The line has been extended to Hamburg since 12 December 2021. Almost all trains end or begin in Hamburg

Two more pairs of trains connect Munich and Berlin via Augsburg as additional services. These trains are not run as Sprinters and also stop in Donauwörth and Coburg. The ICE 1092/1093 train pair runs between Nuremberg and Berlin coupled with the ICE 92/93 train pair on line 91 to/from Vienna.

30–39 
Lines 30 and 39 connect Hamburg with Cologne and Stuttgart. Line 31 runs from Cologne towards Frankfurt and Passau.

30 
Line 30 is increasingly taking over the services of IC line 30. Since 12 December 2021, the line has been extended to Stuttgart and Offenburg.

31 

Most train pairs connect Hamburg with Cologne, Mainz and Frankfurt, with some of them running as far as Nuremberg, Regensburg and Passau. Some trains are operated by ICE Ts between Dortmund and Munich.

Some trains starting from Dortmund run to Munich from Nuremberg. 

From Monday to Friday, an ICE operates from Cologne to Hamburg in the morning on a different route via Düsseldorf, Duisburg, Mülheim (Ruhr), Essen and Bochum.

32 

35 

39 
Line 39 was introduced with the 2021 timetable for trains between Hamburg-Altona and Cologne.

41–49 

Lines 41, 42, 43, 45, 47 and 49 all usually begin in Cologne, Essen or Dortmund and run on the Cologne–Frankfurt high-speed rail line:

41 

Line 41 starts in Essen and runs hourly via Frankfurt am Main and Nuremberg to Munich. Individual trains begin or end in Dortmund. The stops at Cologne/Bonn Airport, Siegburg/Bonn, Montabaur and Limburg South are served by only a few trains. From Monday to Wednesday, the last ICE service from the Ruhr ends in Würzburg and continues in the morning to Essen. A pair of trains leaves for Garmisch-Partenkirchen on Saturdays.

One train runs from Darmstadt to Munich with a detour through the Ruhr area. It starts on Saturdays and Sundays in Cologne Messe/Deutz.

The return train runs from Munich via the same route to Limburg Süd from Monday to Friday, but then runs via Wiesbaden and Mainz to Frankfurt. On Saturdays it ends early in Cologne and on Sundays in Düsseldorf Hauptbahnhof.

42 

Line 42 connects Dortmund and Munich every two hours. It overlap with line 30 between Dortmund and Cologne, with line 43 between Cologne and Mannheim and with line 11 between Mannheim and Munich to provide an hourly service on these sections.

Some trains start and end in Kiel. Some trains run between Dortmund and Cologne via Hagen, Wuppertal and Solingen instead of Bochum, Essen, Duisburg and Düsseldorf. One train starts daily in Munster.

43 

Line 43 connects Cologne, and since 11 December 2022 also Hamburg, with Basel every two hours. The first train starts from Dortmund. Another comes from Amsterdam and is coupled in Cologne with another portion of the train to Basel. On the return journey, both portions of the train run to Cologne, where they are split, one returning to Amsterdam and the other running to Dortmund. At the edges of the day, the trains also stop in Baden-Baden and the last train from Basel runs to Dortmund via Essen.

Line 43 overlaps with line 42 every hour between Cologne and Mannheim, and with line 12 between Mannheim and Basel.

45 

Line 45 starts in Cologne main station and stops between Frankfurt and Cologne at some stations of the Cologne–Frankfurt high-speed rail line. At the end of the high-speed line, it runs to the west and goes via Wiesbaden and Mainz to Stuttgart. 

From Monday to Friday, one train (ICE 712) runs from Mainz to Cologne only and one train (ICE 713) runs Cologne – Mainz – Frankfurt.

47 

The line, which was introduced with the 2014 timetable change, connected individual services between Dortmund and Stuttgart running over the Cologne–Frankfurt and Mannheim–Stuttgart high-speed routes. Frankfurt is served only at the airport and not at the main station. In addition, the frequency has been increased to approximately once every two-hours. The line was extended to Munich over the new Wendlingen–Ulm high-speed railway from December 2022.

49 

Line 49 runs between Cologne and Frankfurt (Main) and stops at all stations of the Cologne–Frankfurt high-speed rail line.

From Monday to Friday, two trains start from Dortmund:

In addition, from Monday to Thursday, a train runs from Cologne to Hamm:

50 
Line 50 is the only east-west ICE line in central Germany. It begins in the east in Dresden and runs via Riesa to Leipzig. After Erfurt, the line runs on the new line. In the city of Frankfurt (Main), trains stop at the Hauptbahnhof (main station) and the airport and continue to Wiesbaden via Mainz. Until the timetable change in December 2015, a train pair ran from Eisenach via Bebra, Kassel, Paderborn and Hamm to Düsseldorf.

There are services every two hours between Dresden and Wiesbaden.

During the daytime it is partly operated as follows:

60 
This is a new service running via the Wendlingen–Ulm high-speed railway, replacing an IC service, since the timetable change in December 2022.

62 

A pair of trains on line 62 was switched to operate as Railjets at the timetable change in December 2016, the other trains continue to operate as Eurocity services.

78–79 

Lines 78 and 79 are international lines. They connect Frankfurt am Main and the Benelux countries:

78 

Line 78 connects Frankfurt am Main with Amsterdam and runs over the Cologne–Frankfurt high-speed railway. Arnhem is the first stop beyond the Dutch border. Services on the line run every two hours.

79 

Line 79 connects Frankfurt (Main) with Brussels and operates in Germany on two high-speed lines: the Cologne–Aachen high-speed railway and the Cologne–Frankfurt high-speed railway. The first station beyond the Belgian border is Liège-Guillemins. The trains previously ran every four hours until services were intensified from December 2016 to run every two hours. On the edge of the day individual services stop at Limburg Sud, Montabaur, Siegburg/Bonn and Cologne/Bonn Airport. Occasionally the trains between Frankfurt and Cologne are coupled with those of line 78.

82–84 

Lines 82 to 84 are international lines connecting western and southern Germany with France:

82 

The line 82 begins at Frankfurt Hauptbahnhof and ends at Paris Gare de l'Est. It operates over the LGV Est, a French high-speed line. Trains run every four hours on the route via Saarbrücken. It stops in Forbach only once a day. Since the commissioning of a new section of the LGV Est in 2016, two train pairs are also routed via Strasbourg, creating an approximate two-hour cycle between Frankfurt, Mannheim and Paris. Both TGVs and ICEs run on the line.

83 

Line 83 starts in Stuttgart. From there, five pairs of trains run over the LGV Est to Paris Est. One train pair per day starts or ends in Munich.

84 

The line 84 connects Frankfurt with Marseille over the LGV Rhin-Rhône and the LGV Méditerranée once a day.

85–91 

Lines 85, 88, 89, 90 and 91 are international lines that end in Switzerland, Austria and Hungary:

85 

Line 85 has connected Frankfurt with Milan once a day through the Gotthard Base Tunnel since December 2017. It runs as EuroCity 151 from Basel to Milan.

The line runs in Germany as ECE 85 and therefore it is not an ICE line, strictly speaking.

In the opposite direction, the train runs between Milan and Olten via the Lötschberg axis (through the Lötschberg Base Tunnel). The journey time is 7:36 hours, which is only two minutes longer than the return journey. The train runs as EuroCity 52 as far as Basel.

88 
Line 88 is a EuroCity-Express service, that was introduced in December 2020. Since then, six pairs of trains have run between Munich and Zurich every two hours, replacing EuroCity line 88. It is operated with Alstom ETR 610 (Astoro) sets of the Swiss Federal Railways.

89 
Line 89 was reintroduced with the timetable change in December 2016. Munich is connected with Feldkirch via Innsbruck once a day. Services on the line run only on Saturdays in the winter sports and the summer season.

90 

The 90 line connects Munich with Vienna and Budapest every two hours. At the weekend, a train pair is extended via Stuttgart to Frankfurt, although Günzburg is served only by trains running towards Frankfurt. It is one of the few ICE lines operated with Railjets.

91 

Line 91 begins in Frankfurt am Main and runs via Würzburg and Nuremberg to Vienna every two hours. Two pairs of trains go via Frankfurt to Dortmund. Another pair of trains leaves from Würzburg deviating via Fulda to Hamburg. A section between Hamburg and Dortmund was dropped in December 2018.

Since December 2018, there has been a daily train pair between Berlin and Vienna (ICE 92/93).  Since December 2021, the service has started and ended at Hamburg-Altona. This service stops at Straubing rather than at Plattling, the usual stop between Regensburg and Passau for line 91.

References

Notes

Footnotes

See also 
List of Intercity-Express railway stations

 
Intercity Express
ICE lines